On April 12, 2016, Surabaya United merged with the team following the Bhayangkara Cup 2016, PS Polri, and changed its name to Bhayangkara Surabaya United F.C. until September 2016.
And in September 2016, their moved home to Bekasi, and change their name to Bhayangkara F.C. Bhayangkara F.C. manage to win the 2017 Liga 1 under coach Simon McMenemy.

Players

Squad information
Players and squad numbers last updated on 20 October 2017.
Note: Flags indicate national team as has been defined under FIFA eligibility rules. Players may hold more than one non-FIFA nationality.

Source:

References

Indonesian football clubs 2017 season
Bhayangkara F.C. seasons